Thioalkalivibrio paradoxus is an alkaliphilic and obligately autotrophic sulfur-oxidizing bacteria. It was first isolated from soda lakes. Its type strain is ARh 1 (= DSM 13531 = JCM 11367).

References

Further reading
Robb, Frank, et al., eds. Thermophiles: biology and technology at high temperatures. CRC Press, 2007.
Seckbach, Joseph, Aharon Oren, and Helga Stan-Lotter, eds.Polyextremophiles: life under multiple forms of stress. Vol. 27. Springer, 2013.
Verstraete, Willy, ed. Environmental Biotechnology ESEB 2004. CRC Press, 2004.
Klotz, Martin G., Donald A. Bryant, and Thomas E. Hanson. "The microbial sulfur cycle." Frontiers in microbiology 2 (2011).

External links
LPSN

Type strain of Thioalkalivibrio paradoxus at BacDive -  the Bacterial Diversity Metadatabase

Chromatiales
Bacteria described in 2002